Divinities: Twelve Dances with God (1995) is the second studio album by Jethro Tull frontman Ian Anderson.

All 12 tracks are instrumental and are influenced by different ethnical musical traditions: Celtic ("In the Grip of Stronger Stuff"), Spanish ("In the Pay of Spain"), African ("En Afrique") and so on.

Anderson undertook a solo tour in 1995, playing the entire album, start-to-finish, as the first half of the concert. The second half was Jethro Tull material, many played as an instrumental version. The band was composed of Jethro Tull members Andrew Giddings and Doane Perry, future Tull member Jonathan Noyce, and Chris Leslie.

Track listing

Personnel 
 Ian Anderson – concert and bamboo flutes
 Andrew Giddings    – keyboards
 Doane Perry        – tuned and untuned percussion
 Douglas Mitchell   – clarinet
 Christopher Cowrie – oboe
 Jonathon Carrey    – violin
 Nina Gresin        – cello
 Randy Wigs         – harp
 Sid Gander         – French horn
 Den Redding        – trumpet

References

External links
 

Ian Anderson albums
1995 albums
EMI Records albums
Albums produced by Ian Anderson